Dorking Football Club was a football club based in Dorking, Surrey, England. The club was formed in 1880 and was the oldest senior football club in Surrey until folding in 2017.

History
After playing in the Mid-Surrey League in the early 1900s, Dorking were founder members of the Surrey County Senior League in 1922, and moved in 1956 to its current ground in Meadowbank Park, having previously played at a ground in Pixham Lane. The club joined the Corinthian league in 1956 and then the Athenian League in 1963. The club merged with Guildford City of the Southern League in 1974 to form Guildford & Dorking United, with Meadowbank as the home ground. However, after just two seasons, the club collapsed in mid-season, with another club being formed called Dorking Town in 1977 to complete its predecessor's remaining games before joining the Surrey Senior League in 1977–78. In 1983, by then playing in the Isthmian League, the club reverted its name to Dorking F.C.

In 1989–90 season Dorking reached the final of the Surrey Senior Cup, one of the oldest cup competitions with the first final contested in 1882–83. This was an achievement the club had only once previously managed in 1885–86 season some 104 years previously. Unfortunately they lost both finals.

In the 1992–93 season, they reached the First Round Proper of the FA Cup for the first time in their history losing out 3–2 to Peter Shilton's Plymouth Argyle.

In 1994/5 Steve and Andy Lunn took over the management roles left at the end of this season and rejoined in 2001/2 season and decided to try and put together a locally based side with great success getting to the last 16 of the FA Vase losing on penalties to Burgess Hill, the first couple of seasons saw them consolidate in Division 2 South of the Ryman League.  2004/5 they beat Dartford away in FA Cup and repeated the success the following Season.

In the 2004–05 season, they played in the Isthmian League Division Two and gained promotion in 2005/ to Division 1 South of Isthmian League but sadly got relegated in the first season. The following season as a result of the restructuring of non-league football they joined the Combined Counties Football League. In 2007/8 following the sacking of Steve & Andy Lunn due to the pair apparently taking the club in the wrong direction the club suffered relegation from the league's Premier Division in 2007/08, playing one season in Division One before gaining promotion back into the Premier division through the play-offs.

Their club captain was Stewart Vaughan, who died after suffering from cancer. On 27 February 2007, a special benefit match was played in his honour in which Portsmouth came from the south coast to face Dorking. Before the match, players from young local football clubs were there to greet Vaughan with a special plaque. A record midweek floodlit attendance of 2,206 watched the match, in which Vaughan played the first five minutes of the match before being substituted. In the end, Portsmouth beat Dorking 7–0 with goals from Svetoslav Todorov (3), Lomana LuaLua, Roudolphe Douala, Matthew Taylor and Berlin Ndebe-Nlome. On 3 April 2007, another benefit match was played, just 48 hours after Vaughan's death, against a Crystal Palace XI. A two-minute silence was observed by the players, officials and supporters, to show their respect and fondness for the former captain before the game, in which 1,201 spectators saw Palace beat Dorking 5–1.

However mid-way through the 2015/16 season, Dorking FC were notified that their ground Meadowbank would not be ready until 2017/18 , due to delays in construction, which has put the club in a financial crisis with the club needing to fund at least £30,000 to ensure another ground-sharing. This cost has propelled the club into the possibility of folding due to this financial crisis now embedded on the club. However after 4 months of uncertainty the club raised the funds and escaped administration & extinction with many supporters providing loans to the club. On 30 April 2016, it was announced that the departure of the first team management team of Glynn Stephens and Steve Hurd would take place at the end of the season.. On 19 May 2016 announced that Crystal Palace Academy Scout Network Manager Danny Fox had been appointed as first team manager.

In February 2017, the club announced its closure.

Ground
Dorking formerly played their home games at Meadowbank, Mill Lane, Dorking. Unfortunately the stadium was deemed unsafe in 2002/03.

During the close season in 2014, it was announced that Dorking would share with Horley Town F.C. until the Meadowbank Stadium was once again fit for use. Meadowbank is not set to be ready until the 2017/18 season.

In March 2016, it was announced that Dorking would groundshare with local rivals Dorking Wanderers FC at the latter's Westhumble ground until Meadowbank was ready in August 2017.

Honours
Surrey Senior Cup:
 Runners-Up (2): 1885–86, 1989–90
Surrey Junior Cup:
 Winners (1): 1903–04

Records
FA Cup best performance: first round proper (1992–93) – Lost 3–2 at home to Plymouth Argyle
FA Trophy best performance: second round proper – 1991–92
FA Vase best performance: fourth round replay – 2001–02  2005/6  last 32 losing to Mildenhall
 Surrey Senior Cup finalists 1885–86, 1989–90

Former Managers

 1993 – 1999 Andy & Steve Lunn
 1999–2000 Steve Osgood
 2000–2001 Ian Dawes
 1994/5 & 2001 – 2007/8 Steve & Andy Lunn
2008–12 Peter Buckland
2012–16 Glynn Stephens

Gallery
The Meadowbank Stadium

References

External links
Official website

Association football clubs established in 1880
Isthmian League
Combined Counties Football League
Corinthian League (football)
Athenian League
Defunct football clubs in Surrey
1880 establishments in England
Defunct football clubs in England
2017 disestablishments in England
Association football clubs disestablished in 2017